Antonio Valero is the name of:

Antonio Valero (actor) (born 1955), Spanish actor
Antonio Valero (footballer, born 1931), Spanish footballer
Antonio Valero (footballer, born 1971), Spanish footballer
Antonio Valero de Bernabé (1790–1863), Puerto Rican military leader
Antonio Valero Vicente (1925–2001), Spanish engineer and academic, the first dean of IESE Business School